Life of an Actress is a 1927 American silent drama film directed by Jack Nelson and starring Barbara Bedford, Bert Sprotte and Lydia Knott.

Cast
 Barbara Bedford as Nora Dowen 
 Bert Sprotte as John Dowen 
 Lydia Knott as Mother Dowen 
 John Patrick  as Bill Hawkes 
 Sheldon Lewis as Hiram Judd 
 James A. Marcus as Jacob Krause 
 John Hyams as Mooch Kelly 
 Bobby Nelson as Bobby Judd

References

Bibliography
 Munden, Kenneth White. The American Film Institute Catalog of Motion Pictures Produced in the United States, Part 1. University of California Press, 1997.

External links
 

1927 films
1927 drama films
1920s English-language films
American silent feature films
Silent American drama films
Films directed by Jack Nelson
American black-and-white films
1920s American films